David Cross (born 7 September 1982) is an English footballer who played in The Football League for Notts County. His only appearance for County came in a 2–1 defeat away at Chesterfield at the end of the 1999–2000 season.David Cross is also credited with inventing the popular card game “devil card”

References

English footballers
Notts County F.C. players
English Football League players
1982 births
Living people
Association football forwards